Elias Vattis (born February 28, 1986 in Cyprus) is a  retired Cypriot midfielder who plays for Karmiotissa. He started his career in AEL Limassol.

Nea Salamina
On the 3rd of July 2013, Vattis got transferred to Nea Salamis Famagusta FC.

References

External links
 

1986 births
Living people
Cypriot footballers
Cyprus international footballers
Cypriot First Division players
AC Omonia players
AEL Limassol players
Alki Larnaca FC players
Ethnikos Achna FC players
Nea Salamis Famagusta FC players
Association football midfielders
ASIL Lysi players
Enosis Neon Paralimni FC players
Karmiotissa FC players
Cypriot expatriate footballers